Shamita Das Dasgupta (Bengali: শমীতা দাশ দাশগুপ্ত; born 1949) is an Asian Indian scholar and activist. A social activist since early 1970s, she co-founded Manavi in 1985. It is the first organization of its kind that focuses on violence against South Asian women in the United States. A part-time teacher and full-time community worker, she has written extensively in the areas of ethnicity, gender, immigration, and violence against women. Her books include: A Patchwork Shawl: Chronicles of South Asian Women in America, Body Evidence: Intimate Violence Against South Asian Women in America, Globalization and Transnational Surrogacy in India: Outsourcing Life and Mothers for Sale: Women in Kolkata’s Sex Trade.

Background
Married at an early age, she moved to the US at the age of 19. She did her undergraduate and graduate studies at Ohio State University and received her PhD in developmental psychology. She moved to New Jersey and taught at Rutgers University for several years. Her deep interest in issues relating to domestic violence led her to head a women’s agency in Pennsylvania. From her association with various women’s organizations, she realized that South Asian women were generally ignored by the mainstream domestic violence organizations, so she decided to establish an organization that would focus on their unique issues. She co-founded Manavi, an organization for South Asian women, in New Jersey with five other women.

Activism and academia
Although, Shamita describes herself as a community worker, she is one of the few community workers who have established themselves as an academic through research and teaching. She has written numerous articles on south Asian women’s issues and collaborated with her physician daughter, Sayantani DasGupta, on mother-daughter experiences. Currently she is an adjunct faculty member at the New York University School of Law. She serves on the editorial board of Violence against Women journal.  Recipient of many awards including the Bannerman Fellowship, she is on the board of several national organizations.

Bibliography

References

Further reading

External links
The Frontline Cover story: The voice of silence

American activists
Indian emigrants to the United States
Scholars from Kolkata
Ohio State University Graduate School alumni
1949 births
Living people
American people of Bengali descent
Women writers from West Bengal
Writers from Kolkata
20th-century American non-fiction writers
20th-century American women writers
21st-century American non-fiction writers
21st-century American women writers
American women non-fiction writers